The Edward Oakes House is a historic house at 5 Sylvia Road in Medford, Massachusetts.  It is a -story timber-frame house, five bays wide, with a gambrel roof, wood shingle siding, and a brick foundation.  A rear leanto section gives the house a saltbox appearance.  The main entrance is flanked by sidelight windows.  It was built c. 1728, probably by Edward Oakes.  It is one of the oldest surviving wood-frame houses in Medford, and is unusual for the period due to its gambrel roof.

The house was listed on the National Register of Historic Places in 1980.

See also
National Register of Historic Places listings in Medford, Massachusetts
National Register of Historic Places listings in Middlesex County, Massachusetts

References

Houses on the National Register of Historic Places in Medford, Massachusetts
Houses in Medford, Massachusetts